Oramed Pharmaceuticals, or Oramed, is a publicly traded company engaged in the development of oral drug delivery systems – most notably an oral insulin capsule for treating type 2 diabetes. The company was founded in 2006 and is headquartered in Jerusalem. Its shares are listed on the NASDAQ Capital Market and the Tel Aviv Stock Exchange.

History 
Oramed Pharmaceuticals was founded in 2006 by Miriam Kidron, a scientist at the Hadassah University Hospital in Jerusalem, and her son Nadav Kidron.

Product pipeline 
Oramed considers its flagship product to be an oral insulin capsule developed to treat sufferers of type 2 diabetes. The Company is currently conducting Phase 3 trials, under the FDA, for oral insulin in Type 2 diabetes.  

In addition to the oral insulin capsule, Oramed is developing an exenatide-based capsule designed to balance blood sugar levels and control appetite, and is conducting clinical trials for the treatment of NASH with oral insulin. 

In 2021, Oramed created a subsidiary, Oravax Medical, to bring an oral Covid-19 vaccine to market.

Miriam Kidron 
Miriam Kidron is the great-niece of Abraham Isaac Kook. After serving in the Israel Defense Forces, she went on to earn a master's degree in Pharmacology and a doctorate in Biochemistry from the Hebrew University of Jerusalem. In 2012, Kidron had 13 grandchildren.

See also 
Avram Hershko
List of companies of Israel
List of Israeli companies quoted on the Nasdaq

References 

Biotechnology companies of Israel
Companies listed on the Nasdaq
Pharmaceutical companies of Israel
Pharmaceutical companies established in 2006
2006 establishments in Israel